The Walter Patterson House is a historic house at 1800 United States Route 65 in Clinton, Arkansas.  It is a single-story stone structure, built out of local fieldstone with cream-colored brick trim.  Its gabled roof has extended eaves with exposed rafters in the Craftsman style.  The house was built in 1946, its stonework done by the regionally prominent mason Silas Owens Sr.

The house was listed on the National Register of Historic Places in 2007.

See also
Walter Patterson Filling Station
National Register of Historic Places listings in Van Buren County, Arkansas

References

Houses on the National Register of Historic Places in Arkansas
Houses completed in 1946
National Register of Historic Places in Van Buren County, Arkansas
1946 establishments in Arkansas
American Craftsman architecture in Arkansas
Houses in Van Buren County, Arkansas